Ethnic Georgians in Russia number 112,765, according to the 2021 Russian Census.

Notable Georgians in Russia 

 Joseph Stalin, General Secretary of the Communist Party of the Soviet Union
 Pyotr Bagrationi, general of the Imperial Russian Army during the Napoleonic War
 Nikolai Baratov, Imperial Russian Army general during World War I
 Lavrenty Beria, bolshevik and a Soviet politician
 Alexander Borodin, composer and chemist
 Sergo Ordzhonikidze, bolshevik and a Soviet politician
 Keti Topuria, singer
 George Balanchine, ballet choreographer
 Roman Bagrationi, Imperial Russian Army general
 Pavel Tsitsianov, Imperial Russian Army General
 Boris Akunin, writer
 Marlen Khutsiev, filmmaker best known for his cult films from the 1960s, which include I Am Twenty and July Rain. 
 Otar Iosseliani, film maker. 
 Bulat Okudzhava, poet, writer, musician, novelist, and singer-songwriter
 Zurab Sotkilava, a Georgian operatic tenor and People's Artist of the USSR recipient.
 Nikolay Tsiskaridze, ballet dancer who had been a member of the Bolshoi Ballet for 21 years (1992–2013).
 Georgiy Daneliya, film director and screenwriter.
 Mikheil Chiaureli,  actor, film director and screenwriter. 
 Zurab Tsereteli, painter, sculptor and architect known for large-scale and at times controversial monuments.
 Konstantin Meladze, composer and producer 
 Grigory Leps,  singer-songwriter
 Oleg Basilashvili, actor and a political figure in the former Soviet Union and Russia. People's Artist of the USSR (1984).
 Otar Kushanashvili, music journalist and broadcaster who describes himself as "anti-publicist".
 Tamara Gverdtsiteli, singer, actress and composer, People's Artist of Ingushetia, Georgia (since 1991) and Russia (since 2004).
 Soso Pavliashvili, singer
 Mikhail Kalatozov,  Soviet film director 
 Sofiko Chiaureli, Soviet actress
 Lidiya Vertinskaya, Soviet and Russian actress and artist.
Alexander Chavchavadze, poet and general in the Russian empire.

See also 
Georgia–Russia relations
Russians in Georgia

References 

Ethnic groups in Russia
Georgian diaspora in Asia
Georgian diaspora in Europe